Laura Blanco (born 6 October 1965) is a Spanish former cyclist. She competed in the women's cross-country mountain biking event at the 1996 Summer Olympics.

References

External links
 

1965 births
Living people
Spanish female cyclists
Olympic cyclists of Spain
Cyclists at the 1996 Summer Olympics
People from Andújar
Sportspeople from the Province of Jaén (Spain)
Cyclists from Andalusia